is a railway station located in the town of Fujisaki, Aomori Prefecture, Japan, operated by the East Japan Railway Company (JR East).

Lines

Station layout
Hayashizakii  Station has one ground-level side platform serving a single bi-directional track. In 2007, the platform was lengthened to accommodate four-car trains, thus eliminating the need for a Selective door operation system. The station is unattended.

History
Hayashizaki Station was opened on April 15, 1935 as a station on the Japan National Railways (JNR). With the privatization of the JNR on April 1, 1987, it came under the operational control of JR East.

Surrounding area

See also
 List of Railway Stations in Japan

References

External links

  

Stations of East Japan Railway Company
Railway stations in Aomori Prefecture
Gonō Line
Fujisaki, Aomori
Railway stations in Japan opened in 1935